The Ministry of Labour and Foreign Employment is the central government ministry of Sri Lanka responsible for labour, foreign employment services and development of Petroleum Resources. The ministry is responsible for formulating and implementing national policy on labour and other subjects which come under its purview. The current Minister of Labour and Foreign Employment is Manusha Nanayakkara. The ministry's secretary is S. M. Gotabaya Jayaratna.

Ministers
The Minister of Labour and Foreign Employment is a member of the Cabinet of Sri Lanka.

Secretaries

References

External links
 

Labour and Foreign Employment
 
Sri Lanka
Labour and Foreign Employment
Members of the Board of Ministers of Ceylon